McVille is an unincorporated community in Boone County, in the U.S. state of Kentucky.

History
Variant names were "Mackville", "Maxville", and "Rices Landing". It is unknown why the name "McVille" was applied to this community.

References

Unincorporated communities in Boone County, Kentucky
Unincorporated communities in Kentucky